The 2019 Wyoming Cowboys football team represented the University of Wyoming during the 2019 NCAA Division I FBS football season. The Cowboys were led by sixth-year coach Craig Bohl and played their home games at War Memorial Stadium as a member of the Mountain Division of the Mountain West Conference.

Previous season
The Cowboys finished the 2018 season 6–6, 4–4 in Mountain West play to finish in third place in the Mountain Division. Despite being bowl eligible, the Cowboys were not invited to a bowl game.

2019 recruiting class
The Cowboys announced an early signing class of 18 high school student athletes on December 19, 2018. On January 28, 2019, the Cowboys added Levi Williams to their recruiting class. The Cowboys completed their recruiting class by adding five more recruits on February 6.

Preseason
Wyoming held their annual Brown and Gold Game on April 27. The Gold Team featured the No. 1 offense, while the Brown Team featured the No. 1 Defense. The Gold Team won, 14–9.

Award watch lists
Listed in the order that they were released

Mountain West media days
Mountain West media days were held on July 23 and 24 at the Cosmopolitan on the Las Vegas Strip.

Wyoming was picked to finish fourth in the Mountain Division in the Mountain West preseason poll.

Media poll

Preseason All-Mountain West
Special Teams Player of the Year: Cooper Rothe, Wyoming

Personnel

Coaching Staff

Roster

Statistics

Team

Offense

Defense

Key: SOLO: Solo Tackles, AST: Assisted Tackles, TOT: Total Tackles, TFL: Tackles-for-loss, SACK: Quarterback Sacks, INT: Interceptions, BU: Passes Broken Up, QBH: Quarterback Hits, FF: Forced Fumbles, FR: Fumbles Recovered, BLK: Kicks or Punts Blocked, SAF: Safeties

Special teams

Awards and honors

All–Conference Teams

Honorable Mentions
 Tyler Hall, Sr., DB
 Logan Harris, Jr., OL
 Cassh Maluia, Sr., LB

All–Americans

Senior Bowls

Logan Wilson, LB – Senior Bowl

Cooper Rothe, PK – East–West Shrine Bowl

Schedule

Source:

Game summaries

Missouri

 Passing leaders: Sean Chambers (WYO): 6–16, 92 YDS; Kelly Bryant (MIZ): 31–48, 423 YDS, 2 TD, 1 INT
 Rushing leaders: Sean Chambers (WYO): 12 CAR, 120 YDS, 1 TD; Tyler Badie (MIZ): 16 CAR, 53 YDS, 1 TD
 Receiving leaders: Raghib Ismail Jr. (WYO): 2 REC, 42 YDS; Albert Okwuegbunam (MIZ): 3 REC, 72 YDS

at Texas State

Passing leaders: Sean Chambers (WYO): 8–18, 103 YDS, 1 INT; Gresch Jensen (TXST): 33–54, 394 YDS, 1 TD, 2 INT
Rushing leaders: Trey Smith (WYO): 16 CAR, 54 YDS; Caleb Twyford (TXST): 10 CAR, 60 YDS, 1 TD
Receiving leaders: Gunner Gentry (WYO): 1 REC, 44 YDS; Hutch White (TXST): 10 REC, 96 YDS

Idaho

Passing leaders: Sean Chambers (WYO): 4–12, 50 YDS; Mason Petrino (IDAHO): 15–33, 184 YDS
Rushing leaders: Trey Smith (WYO): 17 CAR, 152 YDS, 2 TD; Roshaun Johnson (IDAHO): 15 CAR, 69 YDS, 1 TD
Receiving leaders: Jackson Marcotte (WYO): 1 REC, 23 YDS; Jeff Cotton (IDAHO): 6 REC, 91 YDS

at Tulsa

Passing leaders: Sean Chambers (WYO): 9–25, 193 YDS, 1 TD; Zach Smith (TLSA): 25–50, 354 YDS, 2 TD
Rushing leaders: Sean Chambers (WYO): 11 CAR, 83 YDS, 2 TD; Shamari Brooks (TLSA): 17 CAR, 67 YDS, 1 TD
Receiving leaders: Ayden Eberhardt (WYO): 1 REC, 53 YDS, 1 TD; Keenan Johnson (TLSA): 7 REC, 95 YDS

UNLV

Passing leaders: Sean Chambers (WYO): 5–12, 124 YDS, 2 TD; Kenyon Oblad (UNLV): 16–31, 176 YDS, 2 INT
Rushing leaders: Titus Swen (WYO): 14 CAR, 136 YDS, 1 TD; Darran Williams (UNLV): 11 CAR, 30 YDS
Receiving leaders: Josh Harshman (WYO): 1 REC, 56 YDS, 1 TD; Giovanni Fauolo Sr. (UNLV): 4 REC, 83 YDS, 1 TD

at San Diego State

Passing leaders: Sean Chambers (WYO): 5–14, 109 YDS, 1 TD, 1 INT; Ryan Agnew (SDSU): 21–32, 209 YDS, 2 TD
Rushing leaders: Xazavian Valladay (WYO): 16 CAR, 73 YDS; Juwan Washington (SDSU): 23 CAR, 84 YDS, 1 TD
Receiving leaders: Gunner Gentry (WYO): 1 REC, 45 YDS; Jesse Matthews (SDSU): 6 REC, 73 YDS

New Mexico

Passing leaders: Sean Chambers (WYO): 9–15, 86 YDS, 1 TD; Sheriron Jones (UNM): 9–17, 143 YDS
Rushing leaders: Xazavian Valladay (WYO): 33 Car, 127 YDS, 1 TD; Ahmari Davis (UNM): 14 CAR, 86 YDS
Receiving leaders: John Okwoli (WYO): 3 REC, 33 YDS; Jordan Kress (UNM): 4 REC, 94 YDS

Nevada

Passing leaders: Sean Chambers (WYO): 6–9, 158 YDS, 2 TD, 1 INT; Carson Strong (NEV): 26–40, 247 YDS, 1 INT
Rushing leaders: Xazavian Valladay (WYO): 26 CAR, 206 YDS; Devonte Lee (NEV): 3 CAR, 38 YDS
Receiving leaders: Raghib Ismail Jr. (WYO): 4 REC, 93 YDS, 1 TD; Romeo Doubs (NEV): 5 REC, 98 YDS

at Boise State

Passing leaders: Tyler Vander Waal (WYO): 15–23, 160 YDS; Chase Cord (BSU): 19–30, 190 YDS, 1 TD, 1 INT
Rushing leaders: Xazavian Valladay (WYO): 37 CAR, 124 YDS, 1 TD; John Hightower (BSU): 2 CAR, 38 YDS
Receiving leaders: Josh Harshman (WYO): 6 REC, 48 YDS; Khalil Shakir (BSU): 7 REC, 70 YDS

at Utah State

Passing leaders: Tyler Vander Waal (WYO): 20–36, 185 YDS, 3 INT; Jordan Love (USU): 18–29, 282 YDS, 2 TD, 2 INT
Rushing leaders: Xazavian Valladay (WYO): 25 CAR, 114 YDS; Gerold Bright (USU): 17 CAR, 56 YDS
Receiving leaders: Josh Harshman (WYO): 6 REC, 76 YDS; Siaosi Mariner (USU): 4 REC, 123 YDS, 1 TD

Colorado State

Passing leaders: Tyler Vander Waal (WYO): 6–13, 56 YDS; Patrick O'Brien (CSU): 17–29, 217 YDS, 1 TD, 1 INT
Rushing leaders: Xazavian Valladay (WYO): 27 CAR, 154 YDS; Jaylen Thomas (CSU): 14 CAR, 23 YDS
Receiving leaders: Austin Conway (WYO): 3 REC, 35 YDS; Warren Jackson (CSU): 6 REC, 95 YDS, 1 TD

at Air Force

Passing leaders: Levi Williams (WYO): 6–11, 84 YDS, 1 INT; Donald Hammond III (AFA): 5–6, 121 YDS, 1 TD
Rushing leaders: Levi Williams (WYO): 15 CAR, 79 YDS; Kadin Remsberg (AFA): 14 CAR, 63 YDS
Receiving leaders: Raghib Ismail Jr. (WYO): 3 REC, 41 YDS; Benjamin Waters (AFA): 3 REC, 100 YDS, 1 TD

vs. Georgia State – Arizona Bowl

Passing leaders: Levi Williams (WYO): 11–26, 234 YDS, 3 TD, 1 INT; Dan Ellington (GAST): 13–26, 156 YDS, 1 TD, 1 INT
Rushing leaders: Xazavian Valladay (WYO): 26 CAR, 204 YDS, 1 TD; Dan Ellington (GAST): 14 CAR, 70 YDS, 1 TD
Receiving leaders: Xazavian Valladay (WYO): 3 REC, 91 YDS, 1 TD; Cornelius McCoy (GAST): 5 REC, 78 YDS, 1 TD

Players drafted into the NFL

References

Wyoming
Wyoming Cowboys football seasons
Arizona Bowl champion seasons
Wyoming Cowboys football